eDonkey may refer to:
 eDonkey network (also known as eDonkey2000 network or eD2k), a popular file sharing network
 eDonkey2000, a discontinued file sharing program that used the eDonkey network